Bemidji State University (BSU) is a public university in Bemidji, Minnesota. Founded as a preparatory institution for teachers in 1919, it provides higher education to north-central Minnesota.  It is part of the Minnesota State Colleges and Universities system.

History
BSU was founded in 1919 and opened under the name Bemidji State Normal School. The first President Manfred Deputy was appointed to run the new institution and the first class consisted of 38 students. The name was later changed to Bemidji State Teachers College in 1921, then shortened to Bemidji State College in 1957, and finally in 1975, it was changed to its current name Bemidji State University. 
During the 1998–99 academic year, the Board of Trustees recommended changing the name of the university to Minnesota State University–Bemidji, to reflect a change toward unification within the newly formed Minnesota State Colleges and Universities System after other larger institutions had done so. Prominent vocal and written opposition from students, alumni, and local Bemidji residents forced the board to withdraw the recommendation to change the name. Current enrollment is about 5,300 students, with students from 44 US states and 40 countries.

Presidents
Faith Hensrud was named Bemidji State University's eleventh president on April 20, 2016, and took office on July 1, 2016. Hensrud previously worked at the University of Wisconsin-Superior, having served as provost and vice chancellor for academic affairs since 2012.  On August 13, 2021, Hensrud announced she is retiring effective June 30, 2022.

There have been twelve presidents in the history of Bemidji State University.

Academics
Bemidji State University offers 47 different areas of study. Many of its courses are available to be taken online. BSU offers the only BFA in professional and creative writing in the Minnesota State system. The program includes a minor and certificates in electronic writing, consisting of courses in weblogs, wikis, web content writing, web design, digital rhetoric, and teaching writing with technology. Another unique program at Bemidji State University is the Indigenous Sustainability Studies degree; this is the only such program in the United States. Bemidji State also has a 96% rate of social work majors passing their licensing exams compared to the 76% rate for the entire state. In addition, Sattgast Hall is home to a number of natural sciences programs and pre-professional studies.
Bemidji State University accepts approximately 60% of students that apply. They also have an Honors Program which offers classes specific to participating students. Students from their honors program attend regional conferences.

Foreign programs
For 16 years BSU has had a relationship with Liaoning University, a university in China. Each year a professor from Liaoning University goes to BSU to teach Chinese and each summer BSU students participate in "Sino-Summer", a month-long visit to China with half of the time spent at Liaoning University and half touring other parts of China including Beijing, Xi'an and Guilin.

Student life

Student government
The Bemidji State University Student Association holds weekly meetings where the student senate influences life on campus. The members of the student senate are from a diverse group of students based on a number of factors including their year in school. They are voted in by the students through popular elections.

Clubs and organizations
Bemidji State University provides over 100 clubs and organizations, both on and off campus. 
These clubs include interests in music, art, culture, outdoors, business, engineering, athletics, faith, and select majors and minors for students interested in research. Bemidji State only has two active Greek life organizations on campus,  Theta Tau Epsilon Fraternity and Delta Theta Kappa Sorority.

Residence Halls
The university has five residence halls (Linden, Pine, Birch, Oak, and Tamarack) as well as Cedar and University Heights apartments. Freshmen are required to live in either Oak Hall or Tamarack Hall with few exceptions. Linden offers suites that house from 2 to 3 people. Pine has single gender floors with single rooms or two person dorms. Birch is the closest dorms to the academic buildings, and has single or double dorm rooms. Cedar apartments offer single parents a place to live on campus. It provides a fenced outdoor playground as well as an indoor play area for children. Tamarack Hall is the tallest building in Beltrami County.

Sustainability
Bemidji State University is taking steps to reduce their environmental impact and have pledged to be carbon-neutral by 2050. They have an office on campus devoted to sustainability efforts. The sustainability office provides a bike rental service for students called "Bucky's Bikes" and a place where items may be donated and are given away to students at no charge. The Sustainability Office is funded by a student "green fee" which is $7.50 a semester.

Homecoming tradition
In a tradition dating back to the mid-1990s, anytime the team wins homecoming, the players run from the football stadium to nearby Lake Bemidji and dive in. The tradition dates to 1995 when Bemidji State upset the defending conference champion Winona State University in the homecoming game and took their first "victory dip" in the lake. The roots of the tradition date back two years earlier however when, in 1993, an assistant coach attempted to inspire the winless team. He wrote a fictional news story of the upcoming homecoming game. In his account, the team earned an upset homecoming victory and dove into Lake Bemidji in celebration. A real-world victory didn't happen in 1993, nor 1994, but when homecoming victory came in 1995 it was time to get wet. Between 1995 and 2012 the Beavers have won twelve of the seventeen homecoming games.

Student publications and news sources
Bemidji State University has several student run publications and news sources.  They include CRE8 magazine, the Northern Student Magazine, and KBSU-TV, KBSU FM 90.

CRE8 magazine: CRE8 showcases creative works by writers and artists from northern Minnesota.  CRE8 accepts fiction and nonfiction submissions with a word count of 4,000 or less and poetry submissions of 75 lines or less per poem.  English instructor Maureen Gibbon created the online magazine.

Paper Plains: In 2019, the English department launched the new student publication Paper Plains with Maureen Gibbon in position as the academic advisor.

The Northern Student: The Northern Student became Bemidji State's campus newspaper in 1926. Since its conception, the newspaper has been solely staffed and managed by students, as well as published and distributed weekly at no charge to its readers. In the early ‘70s, the Northern Student merged with the Mass Comm. Dept. at the influence of James McMahon, the public relations director for Bemidji State at the time, who also served as the newspaper’s adviser. In 1988, the newspaper was produced through “Newspaper Production,” a three-credit Mass Comm. course taught and advised by Louise Mengelkoch. During this period, the Northern Student stopped receiving funds from the Student Activity Fee Allocation Committee  and was produced strictly on advertising revenue. After a lawsuit, the Northern Student and Mass Comm. Dept. separated in 1992, and the newspaper relocated to the Hobson Memorial Union. Al Nohner, director of Communications and Marketing, created a media board of faculty, students, and community members to choose future Editor-in-Chiefs and advisers, as well as advise the newspaper.  A few years later, the Northern Student began receiving funds from the Student Activity Fee Allocation Committee again. For over a decade the Northern Student functioned outside the Mass Comm. Dept. In the fall of 2009, the Northern Student was without an adviser. After the newspaper was threatened with a lawsuit, the media board appointed an adviser, who was forced to retire less than a year later. In May 2010, the newspaper returned to the Mass Comm. Dept., the media board was disbanded, and a new adviser from the Mass Comm. Dept. was appointed. During the following fall, the Northern Student briefly partnered with the Bemidji Pioneer for advertising and began placing issues of the Bemidji Pioneer inside the Northern Student.  After three months of publication, it was determined that the two newspapers should remain completely separate.

Athletics

The school sports teams are called the Beavers, and are members of the Northern Sun Intercollegiate Conference competing in NCAA Division II, with the exception of men's and women's ice hockey teams which compete in the Central Collegiate Hockey Association and the Western Collegiate Hockey Association at the NCAA Division I level, respectively.

Men's
 Baseball
 Basketball
 Football
 Golf
 Ice hockey

Women's
 Basketball
 Cross country
 Golf
 Ice hockey
 Soccer
 Softball
 Tennis
 Track and field
 Volleyball

Notable alumni
 John A. Ainley Jr., newspaperman and politician
 Trent Baalke, general manager, Jacksonville Jaguars
 Robert Baril, stand-up comedian
 Steve Bell, football coach
 Bob Bird, politician
 Lem Burnham, NFL player
 John Carlson, politician
 Matt Climie, NHL goalie
 Bob Dettmer, politician
 Rob Ecklund, politician
 James Ellisor, basketball player
 Roger Erickson, politician
 Rich Glas, basketball coach 
Frank Haege, Professional and College Head Football Coach 
 Bob A. Johnson, politician, farmer, school social worker
 Brian Leonhardt, NFL tight end
 Michele Leonhart, administrator at the Drug Enforcement Administration
 D. J. LeRoy, football coach
 Andrew Murray, NHL center
 Bob Ness, politician
 Gunner Olszewski, NFL wide receiver
 Marion O'Neill, politician
 Joel Otto, NHL center
 Matt Read, NHL center
 Loren Solberg, politician
 Thomas D. Waldhauser, USMC, Commander of US Africa Command
 Christopher Waller, economist
 Patricia Walrath, politician
 Zach Whitecloud, NHL Defenseman, Vegas Golden Knights

See also

 List of colleges and universities in Minnesota
 Higher education in Minnesota

Notes

References

External links

Bemidji State Athletics website

 
Bemidji, Minnesota
Public universities and colleges in Minnesota
Educational institutions established in 1919
Education in Beltrami County, Minnesota
Buildings and structures in Beltrami County, Minnesota
Tourist attractions in Beltrami County, Minnesota
1919 establishments in Minnesota